Davud Monshizadeh (28 August 1914 – 13 July 1989) was the founder of the SUMKA (the "Iranian National Socialist Workers Party") and a supporter of Nazism in Germany during World War II and in Iran after the war. He was also a scholar in Iranian Studies who later became a professor of Iranian Languages at Uppsala University, Sweden.

Career
Monshizadeh was born in Tehran, Iran. He is mainly remembered for his political life, most notably being the leader of SUMKA, but he is also recognized for his contributions to Iranian linguistics, particularly to the study of Modern and Middle Iranian languages.

Monshizadeh formed the SUMKA in 1940. He had lived in Germany since 1937, and was a former SS member, who fought and was wounded in the Battle of Berlin. He was a professor at Ludwig Maximilians University of Munich and was deeply influenced by Jose Ortega y Gasset's philosophy, even translating many of his books (which he hoped would serve as founding principles for the party), from Spanish to Persian. He returned to Iran in 1950. Monshizadeh would later serve as a professor of Persian Studies at Uppsala University and Alexandria University. Monshizadeh was known as an admirer of Hitler and imitated many of the ways of the National Socialist German Workers Party (such as their militarism and salute), as well as attempting to approximate Hitler's physical appearance, including his moustache.

He is buried at Uppsala Old Cemetery, Sweden.

Chronology
 1931 - Sent to France by Iranian government to study
 1937 - Moved to Germany, a year after the Hitler Cabinet declared Iranians to be "pure-blooded Aryans" and immune to all Nuremberg laws, thus making them capable of becoming Reich citizens.
 1939 - Monshizadeh and Bahram Shahrokh (the future Iranian Propaganda Director) started working for the Persian program of the Third Reich’s Deutsche Radio.
 1940 - He started writing articles for Das Reich, the official newspaper of the German National Socialist party
 1941 - He worked with various organizations in the Third Reich
 1943 - Obtained his doctorate in philosophy and literature from Berlin University
 1945 - During the Battle of Berlin, he fought as a member of the SS. He was injured and hospitalized (off and on) till 1947.
 1947 - Taught Iranology and Persian language in University of Munich
 1950 - He returned to Iran 
 1951 - Along with Manouchehr Amir Mokri and Hussein Zarabi, he established the Iranian National Socialist Party (Sumka), which played a role against oil nationalization in Iran.
 1953 - Monshizadeh was “Unofficially Exiled” to Europe by Shah Mohammad Reza Pahlavi.
1963 - He left Iran in 1963 and came to Sweden on the initiative of Professor Stig Wikander. He spent the rest of his life in Sweden teaching Iranology and Persian language at Uppsala University, eventually becoming Professor in Iranian Languages.
 1989 - He died in Uppsala, Sweden, and is buried at Uppsala old cemetery (Uppsala gamla kyrkogård).

Works 
 Das Persische im Codex Cumanicus, Uppsala: Studia Indoeuropaea Upsaliensia, 1969.
 Topographisch-historische Studien zum iranischen Nationalepos, Wiesbaden: Abhandlungen für die Kunde des Morgenlandes, 1975.
 Wörter aus Xurāsān und ihre Herkunft, Leiden: Acta Iranica; Troisième série, Textes et mémoires, 1990.
 Die Geschichte Zarēr's, ausführlich komment. von Davoud Monshi-Zadeh, Uppsala: Studia Indoeuropaea Upsaliensia, 1981.
 Ta'ziya : das persische Passionsspiel / mit teilweiser Übersetzung der von Litten gesammelten Stücke von Davoud Monchi-Zadeh, Stockholm: Skrifter utgivna av K. Humanistiska vetenskapssamfundet, 1967.
 Vihrūd va Arang : justārhā-yī dar jughrāfiy-̄yi asāṭīr ̄va tārīkh-̄i Īrān-i sharqī, pazhūhish-i Josef Markwart; tarjumah bā iz̤āfāt az Davūd Munshī-Zādah, Teheran: Majmūʻah-'i Intishārāt-i adabī va tārīkhī, 1989. (in Persian)

References

1914 births
1989 deaths
Politicians from Tehran
Iranian emigrants to Sweden
Iranian expatriate academics
Iranian collaborators with Nazi Germany
20th-century Iranian historians
Iranologists
Linguists from Iran
Academic staff of the Ludwig Maximilian University of Munich
Academic staff of Alexandria University
Academic staff of Uppsala University
Fascism in Iran
Burials at Uppsala old cemetery
SS personnel
Iranian expatriates in Germany
SUMKA politicians
20th-century translators
Iranian nationalists
20th-century linguists
Zoroastrian studies scholars